Again is the Alan Stivell's seventeenth album released in 1993 under the Keltia III label by Disques Dreyfus and Sony Music in France. He registers again his greatest successes of the seventies with updated arrangements and help of prestigious guests : Kate Bush, Shane MacGowan from the Irish group The Pogues, the Senegal singer Doudou Ndiaye Rose, the French singers Laurent Voulzy and Breton singers Gilles Servat and Yann-Fañch Kemener.

The album, several times golden record with more than 300.000 sold copies, boosts the interest for the Celtic music, the base for a new wave of his popularity, especially in Brittany and in France. The public immediately acclaimed the album and Stivell during his French tour, with two concerts at the Bataclan, Paris, in January 1994. That is when the Héritage des Celtes of his former guitarist Dan ar Braz is going to arouse the craze of the general public.

Track listing

Personnel 
 Alan Stivell - Arranger, Bombard, Harp (Celtic Acoustic & Electric), Composer, Dulcimer, Irish flute, Keyboards, Percussion, Pipes, Vocals
 Dan Ar Braz - Electric Guitar
 Herve Batteux - Drums, Percussion
 Philippe Chasseloup - Harmonica
 Jean-Luc Chevalier - Electric Guitar 
 Carlos Delgado - Kena, Pan Flute
 John Giblin - Bass
 Karel Holas - Violin, Violin (Electric)
 Herve Kefelean - Banjo
 Robert Le Gall - Electric violin
 Pierrick Lemou - Bouzouki, Violin
 Charlie Morgan - Drums
 Alan Murphy - Guitar
 Patrice Paichereau - Guitar
 Dina Rakotomanga - Bass, Double Bass
 Doudou N'Daiye Rose - Percussion
 Catherine Saint-James - Cello
 Guillaume Saint-James - Keyboards, Saxophone
 Michal Senbauer - Guitar
 Davy Spillane - Pipe
 Vocals : Kate Bush (Arranger, Keyboards, Producer), Shane MacGowan, Laurent Voulzy, Gilles Servat, Yann-Fañch Kemener, Gweltaz-Thierry Adeux, James Wood, Gill O'Donovan, Ffran May

Recording 
 Laurent Dayot - Engineer (Transaction - Ubu, Rennes)
 Erik Chauvieres - Mixing (Arpège Studio, Nantes)
 Herve Le Coz - Mixing
 Del Palmer - Mixing (Abbey Road Studios, London)
 Frederic Marin - Mastering (Translab)
 Jean-Baptiste Millot - Photography

Discography 
Dreyfus Disques FDM36198-2 [original French release]
Mercury [1994]
Membran [2011]

References

Alan Stivell albums
Celtic rock albums
1993 albums
Disques Dreyfus albums